Wu Yizhen (born 26 May 1994 in Shanghai) is a Chinese football player who currently plays for Chinese Super League side Shanghai Shenhua.

Club career
Wu started his professional football career in 2011 when he was promoted to Shanghai Zobon's squad for the 2011 China League Two campaign. He joined Chinese Super League's newcomer Shanghai Dongya in 2013. On 21 May 2013, he made his debut for Shanghai Dongya in the third round of 2013 Chinese FA Cup which Shanghai beat Chongqing Lifan in the penalty shootout. On 25 June 2013, Wu made his Super League debut in a 1–0 away defeat against Guangzhou Evergrande, coming on as a substitute for Lü Wenjun in the 65th minute. In January 2014, Wu signed for Shanghai Dongya's city rival Shanghai Shenxin. At Shanghai Shenxin he would make his debut in a league game against Shanghai Greenland Shenhua on 9 March 2014 in a 2-0 defeat. This was eventually followed by his first goal for the club on 16 May 2015 in a league game against Guangzhou R&F F.C. in a 3-1 victory. The club would be relegated at the end of the 2015 Chinese Super League and Wu remained with the team as they played in the second tier.

Wu transferred to Chinese Super League side Shanghai Greenland Shenhua in December 2018. He would make his debut in a league game against Hebei China Fortune F.C. on 10 March 2019 that ended in a 2-1 defeat. He would go on to score his first goal for the club on 27 April 2019 in 3-2 defeat to Tianjin Tianhai F.C.

Career statistics 
Statistics accurate as of match played 31 December 2020.

Honours

Club
Shanghai Shenhua
Chinese FA Cup: 2019

Wuhan Three Towns
China League Two: 2020

References

External links
 

1994 births
Living people
Chinese footballers
Footballers from Shanghai
Pudong Zobon players
Shanghai Port F.C. players
Shanghai Shenxin F.C. players
Shanghai Shenhua F.C. players
Chinese Super League players
China League One players
Association football midfielders